Samira Khashoggi (1935 – March 1986) was a Saudi Arabian progressive author, as well as the founder of Al Sharkiah magazine. She was the sister of Saudi businessman Adnan Khashoggi. She was the first wife of Egyptian-born businessman Mohamed Al-Fayed and the mother of filmmaker Dodi Al-Fayed. She died of a heart attack in 1986 at the age of 51.

Early life and education
Her father Muhammad Khashoggi was King Abdulaziz Al Saud's personal doctor. She was educated in Egypt.

Career
Samira Khashoggi wrote under the pseudonym Samirah, 'Daughter of the Arabian Peninsula'. Her books include Wadda't Amali (Farewell to my Dreams, 1958), Thekrayāt Dām'ah (Tearful Memories, 1963), Wara' Aldabab (Beyond the Cloud, 1971), Qatrat Min ad-Dumu''' (Teardrops, 1979) and Barīq Aynaik (The Sparkle of Your Eyes). Since 1972, Al Sharkiah has been the leading monthly pan-Arab women's magazine.

In 1962, Khashoggi began to head a women's welfare association, Al Nahda, which was based in Riyadh and was the first organization targeted women in Saudi Arabia. She was one of the Saudi women who supported the education of girls.

Personal life
She met Mohamed Al Fayed on the beach in Alexandria through her brother, Saudi billionaire Adnan Khashoggi and they married in 1954. The marriage lasted two years, and produced one child, Dodi Fayed. Samira separated from Mohamed Al Fayed just months after Dodi's birth and returned to Saudi Arabia. She then married Saudi Ambassador Anas Yassin, and had her second child, Jumana Yassin. 

Samira was the aunt of actress and producer Nabila Khashoggi and of political journalist Jamal Khashoggi. 

Her son Dodi was reportedly devoted to her, and would telephone her almost every day up to her death. Dodi once told a friend: "If it meant giving up everything I have—cars, wealth, and women—I would do it to bring my mother back."

Her daughter is the editor in chief of Al Sharkiah'' magazine.

References

20th-century novelists
20th-century Saudi Arabian women writers
20th-century women writers
1935 births
1986 deaths
Samira
Samira
Pseudonymous women writers
Saudi Arabian novelists
Saudi Arabian women journalists
Women novelists
20th-century pseudonymous writers